Johnny Mahon may refer to:

Johnny Mahon of the Baha Men
Johnny Mahon (footballer) for Leeds, see Billy Furness

See also
John Mahon (disambiguation)